Claude High School is a public high school located in Claude, Texas (USA) and classified as a 1A school by the UIL. It is part of the Claude Independent School District located in north central Armstrong County. In 2013, the school was rated "Met Standard" by the Texas Education Agency.

Athletics
The Claude Mustangs compete in the following sports:

Baseball
Basketball
Cross Country
Football
Golf
Softball
Tennis
Track and Field

State titles
Girls Basketball 
1951(B), 1952(B), 1953(B), 1962(B), 1971(1A), 1972(1A)
Girls Cross Country 
1991(1A)

Notable alumni
Denton Fox (1947-2013), College football All-American.

References

External links
Claude ISD

Schools in Armstrong County, Texas
Public high schools in Texas
Public middle schools in Texas